Pere Marquette Beach in Muskegon, Michigan is a  park comprising  of public beach on Lake Michigan. In 2004 the beach appeared on lists of certified clean beaches published by the National Healthy Beaches Campaign and the Clean Beaches Council.
This city park, located on Lake Michigan, offers a wide expanse of beach, playground, volleyball courts, a restaurant and access to lighthouses and the Muskegon Channel, also the site of the "USS Silversides," a World War II Submarine, and nearby, a full-service restaurant and bar. There is parking meters for the park the fee is 5 dollars for Four hours. Kruse Park, located one block away, is the county's only dog-friendly beach.

References

Parks in Michigan
Protected areas of Muskegon County, Michigan
Beaches of Michigan
Landforms of Muskegon County, Michigan
Tourist attractions in Muskegon, Michigan